Classical Movements of Alexandria, Virginia an American concert touring company, specializing in concert and travel arrangements in 145 countries for professional symphonies and choruses as well as conservatory, university, and youth ensembles. Classical Movements produces two choral festivals around the world: Ihlombe! South African Choral Festival and Serenade! Washington D.C. Choral Festival, in addition to the young artists music festival, Prague Summer Nights. It also commissions new works from Pulitzer, MacArthur and Grammy-winning composers through its Eric Daniel Helms New Music Program.

History 
Previously known as Blue Heart Travel, Inc, the company was established in October 1992 by Neeta Helms and Jacques Vallerand-Parisi with a base in Dupont Circle, Washington, D.C. The company began with tours to Russia and Ukraine one year after the Soviet Union fell and soon added destinations such as Croatia, Eastern Europe, Turkey, South Africa, and Cuba.

Since 1997, Classical Movements has been based in Alexandria, Virginia.

In 2014, Americans for the Arts, an arts advocacy organization in the United States, awarded Classical Movements the BCA10: Best Businesses Partnering with the Arts in America.

Leadership 
 President (1992 - 2008): Jacques Vallerand-Parisi 
 President (2008–present): Neeta Helms

Cultural diplomacy 

Classical Movements has been involved in numerous cultural diplomacy events.

A year after its founding, in 1993, Classical Movements took the Choral Arts Society of Washington on tour to Moscow, Russia with the National Symphony Orchestra conducted by Mstislav Rostropovich. This concert marked the first time any event other than a military parade had taken place in the Red Square. Among the audience of 100,000 was President Boris Yeltsin as millions more watched and listened worldwide to the live broadcast.

Classical Movements began touring to South Africa in 1994 shortly after apartheid was abolished and Nelson Mandela was elected president.

In 1995, Classical Movements became the first American company to offer tours in Croatia after the end of the Croat–Bosniak War, as well as in China becoming one of the first travel companies in the country following the 1989 massacre in Tiananmen Square, and in Vietnam following the new United States Embassy in Hanoi.

Several years later in 2003, the United States Department of State and John F. Kennedy Center for the Performing Arts invited the Iraqi National Symphony Orchestra to perform in Washington, alongside Leonard Slatkin's National Symphony Orchestra. Classical Movements arranged for the Iraqi musicians' travel from Baghdad.

According to its president Neeta Helms, Classical Movements worked for Google in 2009 to arrange all the travel and logistics for the debut of the YouTube Symphony Orchestra, where musicians from across the globe electronically met to perform at Carnegie Hall. In 2011, there was a reprise at the Sydney Opera House.

In 2010, Classical Movements arranged the travel for the first joint concert for American and Cuban choirs in Havana on the 4th of July. Later in 2015 the company arranged a Cuban tour with Minnesota Orchestra despite there being no official diplomatic ties yet between the United States and Cuba.

Classical Movements was also involved in the official United States memorial service for Nelson Mandela at Washington National Cathedral in 2013 where on behalf of the South African Ambassador to the United States, Ebrahim Rasool, they invited original Ihlombe! participants Morgan State University Choir and Pacific Boychoir.

Orchestral and choir tours 

Classical Movements organizes more than 200 concerts on 60 tours each season in 145 countries.

International music festivals 
Classical Movements currently owns and produces two annual international choral festivals and a young artists music festival.

 Ihlombe! South African Choral Festival (since 2009) is the largest choral gathering in South Africa and is hosted in Cape Town, Pretoria, Johannesburg, and Soweto. Concerts include 10-20 South African choirs, workshops, African drumming, and dancing. 
 Serenade! Washington, DC Choral Festival (since 2011) features cultural and musical exchanges with national and international choirs with outreach events, workshops, and performances. Venues have included John F. Kennedy Center for the Performing Arts, Strathmore Music Center, George Washington Masonic National Memorial, and New York Avenue Presbyterian Church.
 Prague Summer Nights: Young Artists Music Festival (since 2015) is a 30-day program for singers and instrumentalists to receive professional performance training and experiences. The vocalists are mentored by a professional faculty of musicians who hold positions at major universities and conservatories or have major performing careers. It includes fully staged opera, directed by the operatic baritone Sherrill Milnes, as well as orchestral concerts, chamber music, solo recitals, and cabaret performed in historic halls in Tábor, Prague, and Salzburg.

Eric Daniel Helms New Music Program 

Since founding the Eric Daniel Helms New Music Program in 2005, Classical Movements has commissioned composers from 20 different countries to create more than 50 new works. Named after Neeta Helms’s late father, the Eric Daniel Helms New Music Program encourages international collaboration. Alumni include American John Corigliano, Chinese-American Bright Sheng, and Cuban Tania León among many others of numerous nationalities. Altogether the composers in the program have won 5 Grammys, 4 Pulitzers, 1 Oscar, and 1 MacArthur.

In 2017, the Syrian composer Kinan Azmeh became Classical Movements' first Composer-in-Residence.

References

External links
 
 Prague Summer Nights
 Serenade! Washington, D.C. Choral Festival
 Ihlombe! South African Choral Festival
 Audio file: People of Note with Richard Cock & Neeta Helms, President of Classical Movements broadcast on Classic FM (South Africa), 10 August 2010

Companies based in Alexandria, Virginia
Entertainment companies established in 1992
Event management companies of the United States
1992 establishments in Washington, D.C.